A number of steamships have been named Missouri, including –
, built by William Gray & Co Ltd, 2,845 GRT
, built by Maryland Steel Co, 7,924 GRT
, built by Chicago Shipbuilding Co, 2,434 GRT.
, built by Harland & Wolff, 4,697 GRT
, built by Chanteliers & Ateliers de St Nazaire, 6,773 GRT
, built by William Gray & Co Ltd, 7,042 GRT

See also

Ship names